Free Basket is a public artwork by the Cuban artist group Los Carpinteros, located in the 100 Acres: The Virginia B. Fairbanks Art and Nature Park, in Indianapolis, Indiana, United States. The artwork is in the form of an international basketball court with twenty-four red or blue steel arches that travel throughout the court, mimicking the trajectory of two bouncing basketballs. Two of the arches terminate with their own regulation size basketball hoop, netting, and backboard.

Description
Free Basket is located outside the boundary of the 100 Acres park on city property.  The parking loop surrounding the artwork is situated just south of the Lake and west of the museum.  The artwork can be accessed by means of the IWC Canal Greenway (Central Canal Trail), W 38th Street, and the 100 Acres Park walkway.  Free Basket is a site-specific work consisting of twenty-four red- or blue-painted steel tubular arches that mimic the trajectory of two bouncing basketballs.  The arches travel throughout the court and are of varying heights and span widths.  Two of the arches (one red and one blue) are capped at midpoint, each with their own basketball backboard fashioned with: backboard, metal rim, and nylon net.  The steel arches have been mounted on a level, rectangular concrete surface that is size of an international basketball court, where they have been filled and secured with concrete cement.  The concrete court has been surfaced with Rhino Guard colored plastic and has been painted to the standards of an international basketball court. The primary court color is yellow, the “goal lines” are painted white, and sections of black and green flank both sides of the court, and a black border surrounds entire court.  There are also built-in lighting systems that have been sunk into the court to illuminate the sculpture.

Historical information
Los Carpinteros sought to portray the juxtaposition of the practical and the imaginary with Free Basket, and drew on the history of sports in Indianapolis to merge art, sports, and culture.

The sculpture is referenced in John Green’s novel “The Fault in Our Stars” when the main characters, Hazel and Augustus, have a picnic in the Virginia B. Fairbanks Art & Nature Park: 

“We drove right past the museum and parked right next to this basketball court filled with huge red and blue arcs that imagined the path of a bouncing ball.”

Location history
This artwork was installed at the IMA in May 2010.

Acquisition
Free Basket has been acquired by the Indianapolis Museum of Art.

Condition
In general, the artwork requires regular cleaning of both the steel and court components to discourage the buildup of damaging materials.  Instrumental analysis involving the artwork's color and gloss levels has also been recorded.

See also

 Team Building (Align)
 Eden II

References

Conceptual art
Sculptures of the Indianapolis Museum of Art
Outdoor sculptures in Indianapolis
2010 sculptures
Basketball mass media
Steel sculptures in Indiana
Sculptures of sports